Richard Stapley (20 June 1923 – 5 March 2010), also known by the stage name Richard Wyler, was a British actor and writer.

Early life
Stapley was born in Westcliff-on-Sea, Essex, England in 1923. A writer, Stapley published his first novel when he was just 17 years old. He served in the Royal Air Force during the Second World War.

Career
Following the end of the Second World War, Stapley began appearing in theatre roles in London. He soon signed with Metro-Goldwyn-Mayer (MGM), making his film debut in a supporting role in the 1948 film, The Three Musketeers. He next appeared in the 1949 remake, Little Women, in which he played John Brooke, the love interest of Janet Leigh's character, Meg.

He continued to appear in a string of Hollywood films at different studios during the 1940s and 1950s, including the 1951 period drama The Strange Door, which co-starred Boris Karloff and Charles Laughton; 1953's King of the Khyber Rifles, which starred Tyrone Power; Charge of the Lancers with Paulette Goddard; and The Iron Glove with Robert Stack in 1954. In 1955 Stapley starred in Target Zero as a British tank commander serving in the Korean War.

Stapley returned to Britain and Europe in 1960, where he adopted the stage name, Richard Wyler. His British television credits from that era included the crime series, Man from Interpol and the film Identity Unknown (1960). He also appeared in the 1961–1962 American dramatic television series Window on Main Street.

He travelled to the Continent where he starred in a series of European-made adventure and western films using the name, Richard Wyler, including The Barbarians, The Exterminators, The Bounty Killer, Dick Smart 2.007, and The Girl from Rio.

During the early part of the decade, he wrote Thru the Gears, a monthly feature for American magazine Motorcyclist, a weekly column for Motor Cycling magazine, Richard Wyler's Coffee Bar Column, and owned a shop in Central Road, Worcester Park, London, specialising in performance motorcycle parts and accessories. The shop was later sold to Cyril Jones.

During the 1970s, Stapley returned to film roles under his birthname, Richard Stapley. He co-starred in the 1970 film, Connecting Rooms, in a supporting role to stars Michael Redgrave and Bette Davis. He was also cast in Alfred Hitchcock's Frenzy.

When his acting roles became fewer he became a radio announcer in Britain, raced motorbikes, and in the 1970s worked part-time as a motor cycle courier.

Stapley became a naturalised US citizen during his later life. He focused on writing following his acting career. He published a novel entitled, Naked Legacy, in 2004. Stapley also completed a second novel and corresponding adapted screenplay, both called Tomorrow Will Be Cancelled. He was working on an autobiography at the time of his death in 2010.

Richard Stapley died of kidney failure at Desert Regional Medical Center in Palm Springs, California, on 5 March 2010, at the age of 86. His death was announced by his publicist, Alan Eichler.

Filmography

References

External links
 
 Richard Wyler racing in a 1961 film by Pathé News

1923 births
2010 deaths
20th-century English novelists
21st-century British novelists
20th-century English male actors
English male film actors
English screenwriters
English male screenwriters
English male television actors
British expatriate male actors in the United States
Royal Air Force personnel of World War II
People from Westcliff-on-Sea
Male actors from Essex
Deaths from kidney failure
Writers from Essex
Royal Air Force airmen
Military personnel from Southend-on-Sea